Francisco Efren Nazareno Mercado (born December 13, 1993) is an Ecuadorian footballer. He currently plays midfield for Barcelona.

External links
Nazareno's player card on FEF 

1993 births
Living people
Sportspeople from Guayaquil
Association football midfielders
Ecuadorian footballers
S.D. Quito footballers
Barcelona S.C. footballers